The Stelljes House is a historic house on New Hampshire Route 31 in Goshen, New Hampshire. Built about 1800, it is one of the oldest of a cluster of plank-frame houses in Goshen. The house was listed on the National Register of Historic Places in 1985. It has possibly been demolished.

Description and history
The Stelljes House stands in a rural area of southern Goshen, on the east side of NH 31. It is a -story wooden structure, with a gabled roof and clapboarded exterior. A brick chimney rises slightly off-center from the roof ridge. The main facade is asymmetrical, with a slightly off-center entrance, two sash windows to its left, and a three-section modern picture window to the right. A gable dormer projects from the rear roof face. An ell extends from the southern portion of the rear of the main block, with a porch in the corner joining the two blocks.

The house was built about 1800, and is one of the oldest of Goshen's cluster of plank-frame houses. The framing is three-inch planking attached vertically to sills, which rests on a rubble and granite stone foundation. Dowels are attached horizontally to give this framing lateral stability. The front facade was probably originally five bays across.

See also
National Register of Historic Places listings in Sullivan County, New Hampshire

References

Houses on the National Register of Historic Places in New Hampshire
Houses completed in 1800
Houses in Goshen, New Hampshire
National Register of Historic Places in Sullivan County, New Hampshire